Kim Soo-hyun (born February 16, 1988) is a South Korean actor.

Film

Television series

Web series

Hosting

Music video appearance

Narration

References

South Korean filmographies